"I Wanna Be Your Lover" is a song by American recording artist Prince. It was released on August 24, 1979, as the lead single from his second album, Prince. The song was Prince's first major hit single in the United States, reaching number 11 on the Billboard Hot 100 on January 26, 1980, holding the number 11 position for two weeks, and peaking at number one on the Billboard Hot Soul Singles chart for two weeks.

Composition
"I Wanna Be Your Lover" was written after Warner Bros. requested a follow-up to Prince's debut album For You, which had underperformed commercially. In response, Prince recorded "I Wanna Be Your Lover." Musically, it is a funk song sung exclusively in falsetto, detailing Prince's love for a woman and how he would treat her better than the men she is with, and frustration that she thinks of him as "a child". The single edit stops after 2:57, but the album version goes off on a jam of keyboards and synthesizers, including a Polymoog, played by Prince. It was later revealed that the song concerned a crush Prince had at the time on pianist and singer Patrice Rushen.

Promotion
Prince promoted the song by lip-syncing it with his band on The Midnight Special and American Bandstand, where he gave host Dick Clark an awkward interview, answering his questions with one-word answers. Prince claimed to be 19 but was 21 at the time. Clark later said, "That was one of the most difficult interviews I've ever conducted, and I've done 10,000 musician interviews."

The song was also Prince's debut single released in the UK; it was not a hit, only reaching No. 41 on the UK Singles Chart and when Prince tried to promote it with shows in London, he was forced to cancel due to poor attendance. It would not be until Purple Rain (1984) that Prince would break big in Europe.

The song additionally reached No. 2 on the Hot Dance Club Play chart and No. 2 in New Zealand.

Prince included a sample of this song in the opening of his 1992 hit single "My Name Is Prince".

Music video
There are two versions of the music video of the hit single. The main version has Prince in an unbuttoned leopard shirt and jeans singing alone in a black background with only a mic, notably with straight/wavy hair and a departure from his afro from a year before. Various shots show him playing the instruments by himself.

The other version, which has not aired and was not featured on The Hits Collection compilation shows Prince and his band members performing the song in a painted room. The video was pulled due to skimpy clothing and a sexually suggestive theme (Prince was clad in blue stockings and a tan shirt).

Track listings
7" single
A. "I Wanna Be Your Lover" (edit) – 2:57
B. "My Love Is Forever" – 4:08

7" single (UK)
A. "I Wanna Be Your Lover" (edit) – 2:57
B. "Just as Long as We're Together" (edit) – 3:25

7" single (DEU)
A. "I Wanna Be Your Lover" (edit) – 2:57
B. "Why You Wanna Treat Me So Bad?" – 3:49

12" single (UK)
A. "I Wanna Be Your Lover" – 5:47
B. "Just as Long as We're Together" – 6:24

12" promo
A. "I Wanna Be Your Lover" (edit) – 2:57
B. "I Wanna Be Your Lover" – 5:57

Personnel 

 Prince – all instruments and vocals

Charts

Weekly charts

Year-end charts

Certifications

Cover versions

In 1991, hip hop artist M-Doc sampled this song in his single "Are U Wid It?".
In 1994, Gayle & Gillian Blakeney covered the song, which was entitled "Wanna Be Your Lover". It peaked at number 62 on the UK Singles Chart.
In 2009, Patrick Stump did a cover of the song in a RollingStone.com exclusive video.
Millie Jackson also covered the track, changing the opening line to "I've got plenty of money..."
Haywoode covered the song on her 1985 album Arrival.
Rapper 50 Cent added his own verse to the song, dubbing the resulting song "Your Favorite".
 In 2010, Japanese pop band Nona Reeves released a cover version.
In 2011, Corinne Bailey Rae released a cover of the song on her The Love E.P.
In 2011, Guga Neiva released a cover as lead single on debut album, 17.
In 2011, Max Tundra put out a version that sounds like it was recorded lower and slower and then sped up to achieve a falsetto effect on the lead vocal.
In 2012, the song was performed as part of a Prince medley on the reality singing contest The Voice by the judges  (Christina Aguilera, Cee Lo Green, Adam Levine and Blake Shelton), with Adam Levine performing his solo part on this song.
Singer Kimbra has performed "I Wanna Be Your Lover" numerous times in her live shows, later stating in an interview that she felt the song was "incredible." A video of her performance was posted on her official YouTube channel, but was later taken down for copyright reasons, which has happened numerous times with videos featuring Prince's compositions.
In 2013 on the 12th Annual Honda Civic Tour, pop rock band Maroon 5 performed the song regularly as a part of their set.

See also
List of number-one R&B singles of 1979 (U.S.)

References

Prince (musician) songs
Songs written by Prince (musician)
1979 singles
Warner Records singles
Song recordings produced by Prince (musician)
1979 songs